John Bridgeman (by 1489–1523) was an English politician.

Personal life
He married Alison Bartlett, daughter of Richard Bartlett, widow of a man named Philip.

Professional life
He was a Member (MP) of the Parliament of England for Exeter in 1523. He was described as ‘a wise man ... of great experience.’

References

15th-century births
1523 deaths
Members of the Parliament of England (pre-1707) for Exeter
English MPs 1523